Hortonville may refer to:
Hortonville, Nova Scotia
Hortonville, Indiana
Hortonville, Massachusetts
Hortonville Historic District, Massachusetts
Hortonville, New Mexico
Hortonville, New York
Hortonville, Vermont
Hortonville, Wisconsin
Hortonville Area School District, Wisconsin

See also
Horton (disambiguation)
Hortonia (disambiguation)